Emil Smith "Liz" Liston (August 21, 1890 – October 26, 1949) was an American athletic coach and administrator. He coached basketball, football and baseball at Wesleyan University and Baker University. He was the founder of the National Association of Intercollegiate Athletics, organized the NAIA college basketball tournament in 1937 and served as the first executive director of the National Association of Intercollegiate Basketball (predecessor to the NAIA) from 1940 to 1949.  He was posthumously inducted into the Naismith Memorial Basketball Hall of Fame in 1975.

Early years
A native of Stockton, Missouri, Liston attended Baker University in Kansas. From 1916 to 1918, he was the athletic director at Michigan College of Mines (which is now known as Michigan Technological University). According to some accounts, he also played football at Michigan College of Mines.

Wesleyan
In September 1918, Liston was hired by Wesleyan University as coach of the school's football team.  He left Wesleyan in June 1919 to play professional baseball for the Wichita, Kansas team in the Western League.  After spending the summer playing baseball in Wichita, Liston returned to Wesleyan as the head football coach in the fall of 1919.  In two years as Wesleyan's football coach, Liston compiled a 10–3 record.  His .769 winning percentage at Wesleyan remains the highest of any Wesleyan football coach with at least ten games as coach.  Liston also coached the basketball and baseball teams at Wesleyan.  In April 1920, Liston announced his resignation from Wesleyan.

Baker
After resigning from Wesleyan, Liston announced he was through with the coaching profession and that it was his intention to move to Kansas to work on the farm of his father-in-law.

He returned to coaching in 1920 with Baker University in Baldwin City, Kansas.  He coached both football and basketball at Baker.  He was the coach of the basketball team from 1930 to 1945 and led the school to Kansas Conference championships in 1930 and 1937.  He also coached Baker's football teams and was for many years the school's winningest football coach with 97 wins; the career wins record was broken in 1992 by Charlie Richard.

The university named their football stadium Liston Stadium in his honor.

NAIA/NAIB
Liston was also the founder of the National Association of Intercollegiate Athletics, organized the NAIA college basketball tournament, and a close friend of James Naismith.  In 1945, Liston resigned his coaching position at Baker University to become the NAIB's first executive director; he held that position until his death in 1949.  He was inducted into the Naismith Memorial Basketball Hall of Fame in 1975.  Liston's biography at the Basketball Hall of Fame states: "With sheer initiative, drive, and foresight, Emil Liston fought for uniformity and equality in college athletics. A dedicated administrator, Liston envisioned a small college, national tournament and organized the NAIB (now known as the NAIA). The first NAIA tournament was played in Kansas City with an eight-team field in 1937."

Later years and death
Liston died of a heart attack, on October 26, 1949, while reading at his home in Baldwin, Kansas.

Head coaching record

College football

References

External links
 
 
 

1890 births
1949 deaths
Baker Wildcats athletic directors
Baker Wildcats football coaches
Baker Wildcats football players
Baker Wildcats men's basketball coaches
Colorado Springs Millionaires players
Emporia Bidwells players
Michigan Tech Huskies athletic directors
Michigan Tech Huskies football players
Wesleyan Cardinals athletic directors
Wesleyan Cardinals baseball coaches
Wesleyan Cardinals men's basketball coaches
Wesleyan Cardinals football coaches
Wichita Witches players
Naismith Memorial Basketball Hall of Fame inductees
National Collegiate Basketball Hall of Fame inductees
High school basketball coaches in the United States
People from Baldwin City, Kansas
People from Stockton, Missouri
Coaches of American football from Missouri
Players of American football from Missouri
Basketball coaches from Missouri